KRVO is a commercial radio station in Columbia Falls, Montana, broadcasting to the Kalispell-Flathead Valley, Montana area on 103.1 FM.

KRVO aired an adult album alternative music format branded as “The River”, but evolved into a hot adult contemporary format while keeping the River moniker. It is owned by Rose Communications, and operated by Bee Broadcasting, Inc. All Bee Broadcasting stations are based at 2431 Highway 2 East, Kalispell.

External links
Official Website

RVO
Hot adult contemporary radio stations in the United States
Radio stations established in 2006